La Belle Township is an inactive township in Lewis County, in the U.S. state of Missouri.

La Belle Township was established in 1866, and named after the community of La Belle, Missouri.

References

Townships in Missouri
Townships in Lewis County, Missouri